Yuji Onizaki (鬼﨑 裕司, born April 7, 1983 in Saga, Saga) is a Japanese professional baseball infielder for the Saitama Seibu Lions in Japan's Nippon Professional Baseball.

External links

NPB.com

1983 births
Living people
Baseball people from Saga Prefecture
Japanese expatriate baseball players in the United States
Waikiki Beach Boys players
Nippon Professional Baseball infielders
Tokyo Yakult Swallows players
Saitama Seibu Lions players
Japanese baseball coaches
Nippon Professional Baseball coaches